Kan Mehtarzai railway station was a railway station located in the Balochistan province of Pakistan. It is on Zhob Valley Railway, the former narrow-gauge line between Bostan and Zhob, 16 miles west of Muslim Bagh. At 2224 meters above sea level, it was the highest railway station in Pakistan until service was discontinued in 1986.

See also
 List of railway stations in Pakistan
 Pakistan Railways

References

External links

Railway stations in Killa Saifullah District
Railway stations on Zhob Valley Railway Line
Railway stations opened in 1921
Railway stations closed in 1986